Rock Show may refer to:

 "Venus and Mars/Rock Show", a 1975 song by Paul McCartney & Wings
 Rockshow, a 1980 concert film by Paul McCartney & Wings
 "Rock Show", a song by Run–D.M.C. from their 2001 album, Crown Royal
 "The Rock Show", a song by Blink-182 from their 2001 album Take Off Your Pants and Jacket
 "Rock Show" (Peaches song), 2000
 "Rock Show" (Grinspoon song), 1999
 Rock Show (album), a 2007 live album by Toadies
 Rock Show consortium, owners of the Planet Rock UK radio channel
 "Rock Show" (Parks and Recreation), the 2009 first season finale of NBC's Parks and Recreation
 The Rock Show (Jon English album), a musical theatre production that starred Jon English.